Gayle Adams is an American urban contemporary and house music musician, who is best known for her hit singles "Love Fever", "Stretch'in Out" and "Your Love Is a Lifesaver." She recorded two albums for the dance-oriented Prelude record label in the early 1980s, which were written and produced by the Washington D.C. based record producers, Willie Lester and guitarist Rodney Brown. Adams most successful single was "Love Fever", which reached number six on the US dance charts, and number 24 on the soul singles chart in 1981. "Stretch'in Out" peaked at number 64 in the UK Singles Chart in July 1980. Her most recent hit single was "I'm Warning You" (1984).

Discography

Studio albums
Gayle Adams (Prelude, 1980)
Love Fever (Prelude, 1982)

Compilation albums
 Gayle Adams / Love Fever (Deepbeats, 1997)

Singles

References

External links
 Album and singles discography at Discogs.

Year of birth missing (living people)
Living people
Singers from Washington, D.C.
20th-century African-American women singers
American boogie musicians
American house musicians
American disco musicians
Prelude Records artists
American women in electronic music
21st-century American women singers
21st-century American singers